Arthur John McNelly (March 28, 1949 – March 15, 2020) was an American curler and curling coach.

McNelly as lead for Don Cooper's team won the United States men's curling championship in 1983, defeating Bud Somerville in the final. He was also two-time United States mixed curling champion curler.

McNelly was a long-time director of the United States Curling Association. He was USCA president in the 2002-2003 season. He served as U.S. Olympic Curling Team Leader in 2002 and 2006, and was for many years curling’s representative or alternate representative to the U.S. Olympic Committee.

Teams

Men's

Mixed

Record as a coach of national teams

References

External links
 

1949 births
2020 deaths
People from Perham, Minnesota
Sportspeople from Colorado Springs, Colorado 
American male curlers
American curling champions
American curling coaches